Lourdinha Bittencourt (née Maria de Lourdes Bittencourt; October 30, 1923 – August 19, 1979) was a Brazilian actress and singer who took part in the musical ensemble Trio de Ouro from 1952 to 1957, replacing the lead singer Dalva de Oliveira. She also appeared in telenovelas such as Rosa Rebelde (1969), Véu de Noiva (1969), Irmãos Coragem, (1970), Selva de Pedra (1972), Fogo Sobre Terra (1974), and in films such as Poeira de Estrelas (1948), É Proibido Sonhar (1944) and Obrigado, Doutor (1948). She died in 1979 of a stroke.

Life and career

As a movie star
Abandoned in the orphanage Asilo Melo Matos at birth, Lourdinha Bittencourt was adopted by piano teacher Maria Bittencourt. Since her childhood she showed interest in music and dance. Stimulated by her mother she began taking courses to develop her artistic skills, a process which soon led her to work at Cassino da Urca as child prodigy. In 1935, she appeared in the cast of the movie Noites Cariocas, and in several other films the following years. Lourdinha Bittencourt took part in mmany films such as Maria Bonita and Cidade Mulher, both from 1936. She also appeared in É Proibido Sonhar (1943), Moleque Tião (1943), Asas do Brasil (1947), Obrigada Doutor, and Poeira de Estrelas (1948), O Homem Que Passa and Não Me Digas Adeus (1949).

As singer
In 1949, she recorded her first solo album for the label Star, with the songs Não Vale Recordar by Mário Rossi and José Conde, and Lenço Branco by Oscar Bellandi. Three years later she married Antonio Gonçalves Sobral, popularly known as Nelson Gonçalves, with whom she had two children. That same year she joined the third formation of the musical band Trio de Ouro, replacing singer Naomi Cavalcanti, alongside Herivelto Martins and Raul Sampaio. Among her first recordings as member of the band was a re-recording of Ave Maria no Morro, one of the great hits of the band at the beginning of the 1940s, sung by Dalva de Oliveira. The band was commissioned by Radio Nacional, remaining in the company until 1954. She then traveled throughout several Brazilian states, besides going to Argentina, Uruguay, Chile and Peru. Despite the success of the band at that time, she was the female figure who never equaled Dalva de Olivera, nonetheless they achieved some success with her vocals on India by J. A. Flores and M. Guerrero, Negro telefone by Herivelto Martins and David Nasser, Saudades de Mangueira by Nelson Trigueiro and Bartholomew Silva, and Luzes da Ribalta by Charles Chaplin.

In 1957, Lourdinha Bittencourt faced health problems that prompted her departure from the band. In 1959, her marriage broke apart and she then divorced Nelson Gonçalves. In 1960, she released an album with the song Ouvi Dizer by Adelino Moreira, and Como No Primeiro Dia (Comme Au Premier Jour) by Hubert Giraud and Pierre Dorsey through the label Polydor. The following year she released through RCA Victor a 78-RPM album with another song by Adelino Moreira entitled Ouvi Dizer and Eu Te Amo, also by Adelino Moreira with participation of Nelson Gonçalves.

As actress on television
From 1969, she worked as an actress of telenovelas, debuting in the role of Martha in Rosa Rebelde. In 1970, she appeared in the cast of the soap opera Irmãos Coragem, one of the greatest soap operas of Brazilian television produced by Rede Globo. Four years later she starred in Fogo Sobre Terra, her last appearance on television. That same year, she took part in the album Encontro com Adelino Moreira na Churrascaria Cinderela, where she sand the songs Ouvi dizer and Eu te amo.

Filmography

Films
1935 – Cabocla Bonita
1936 – Noites Cariocas
1937 – Maria Bonita
1943 – Moleque Tião
1944 – É Proibido Sonhar .... Cantora
1947 – Asas do Brasil
1947 – Não me Digas Adeus
1948 – Obrigado, Doutor
1948 – Poeira de Estrelas
1949 – O Homem que Passa
1952 – Está com Tudo
1953 – Com a Mão na Massa
1956 – Guerra ao Samba
1956 – Samba na Vila

Television
1969 – Rosa Rebelde .... Marta
1969 – Véu de Noiva
1970 – Irmãos Coragem .... Manoela
1972 – Selva de Pedra
1974 – Fogo Sobre Terra .... Suely

Discography

References

External links
 

1923 births
1979 deaths
20th-century Brazilian actresses
Brazilian film actresses
Brazilian soap opera actresses
People from Campinas
20th-century Brazilian women singers
20th-century Brazilian singers